Diamond Bank Plc., was a Nigerian multinational financial service provider. Diamond Bank was acquired by Access Bank in December 2018, and announced to complete the transactions of the merger fully in the first half of 2019. On 1 April 2019, Diamond Bank was fully merged with Access Bank to build a new entity while retaining the name of Access Bank with a logo that took the form of Diamond Bank.

Overview
The bank provides financial services. Its headquarters is located in Calabar, Nigeria. As at June 2013, the bank operated 267 branches in Nigeria.

Leadership
Uzoma Dozie is the CEO. The other board of directors is Mrs. Caroline Anyanwu, Mrs. Chizoma Okoli, Mr. Chiugo Ndubisi, Mr. Kabir Alkali Mohammed, Mr. Damian Dolland, Mr. Dele Babade,   Mr. Christopher Ubosi, and Mr. Idris Mohammed.

See also

 List of banks in Nigeria
 List of banks in Africa
 Central Bank of Nigeria
 Economy of Nigeria

References

External links
 Company Profile At Google Finance

Companies formerly listed on the London Stock Exchange
Defunct banks of Nigeria
Banks established in 1991
Companies based in Lagos
2019 mergers and acquisitions
Nigerian companies established in 1991